Cirripectes quagga, also known as the squiggly blenny or zebra blenny, is a species of combtooth blenny found in coral reefs in the Pacific and Indian oceans.  This species reaches a length of  TL.

References

quagga
Fish described in 1924